The 1925 Bowling Green Normals football team was an American football team that represented Bowling Green State University as a member of the Northwest Ohio League (NOL) during the 1925 college football season. In its second season under head coach Warren Steller, the team compiled a 3–1–3 record (2–0–1 against conference opponents), and won the NOL championship. The team opened the season 0–1–3 but won the final three games of the season. The team played its home games at College Field in Bowling Green, Ohio.

Paul E. Landis, Robert Younkins, and Franklin Skibbie were assistant coaches. Harry Crawford was the team captain.

Bowling Green refused to play a post-season game with Toledo after university officials, including coach Steller, witnessed unsportsmanlike conduct in an Armistice Day game between Toledo and Findlay.

Schedule

Roster
 Claude Berry, halfback, Bowling Green, OH, 155 pounds
 Ralph Castner, tackle, Bowling Green, OH, 227 pounds
 George Crawford, Graysville, OH, 140 pounds
 Harry Crawford, end, Pemberville, OH, 141 pounds
 George Evans, tackle, Bloomdale, OH, 171 pounds
 Edward Fries, quarterback, Bowling Green, OH, 135 pounds
 Willie Gahn, halfback
 Vaughn Gill, fullback, Delta, OH, 152 pounds
 Ora Knecht, guard, Edgerton, OH, 234 pounds
 Homer Moscoe, Potsdam, NY, 148 pounds
 Olds, center
 Ostrander, end
 Wilbur Swartz, guard, Cygnet, OH, 168 pounds

References

Bowling Green
Bowling Green Falcons football seasons
Northwest Ohio League football champion seasons
Bowling Green Normals football